The Voice Kids is a Dutch-language Belgian music talent show for aspiring singers aged 8 to 14, based on the concept of the show The Voice van Vlaanderen. The first broadcast took place on 5 September 2014 on VTM. The winners of the six seasons have been: Mentissa Aziza, Jens Dolleslagers, Katarina Pohlodkova, Jade De Rijcke, Gala Aliaj & Karista Khan.

Overview

Coaches and finalists

The box shows finalists of each team, the bold ones are the winners/topfinalist
  Winner
  Runner-up
  Third place
  Fourth place

Season summary

Coaches' teams 

 Winner
 Runner-up
 Third place
 Fourth place
 Eliminated in the Final
 Eliminated in the Semi Final
 Eliminated in the Battles / Knockouts

Season 1 (2014) 
The inaugural season premiered on 5 September 2014 with Sean Dhondt, Natalia Druyts, and Regi Prenxten as coaches. Mentissa Aziza from Team Natalia won the season finale a week before Halloween.

Season 2 (2015-16) 
Season 2 of The Voice Kids premiered on 20 November 2015 with Sean Dhondt and Natalia Druyts switching seats while Slongs Dievanongs replaced Regi Prenxten. Jens Dolleslaeghers from Team Slongs won the season 2 finale at the beginning of 2016.

Season 3 (2017) 
Season 3 of The Voice Kids premiered on 14 April 2017 with Sean Dhondt as a returning coach while Eurovision Song Contest 2016 star Laura Tesoro and former K3 member Josje Huisman replacing Natalia Druyts and Slongs Dievanongs, respectively. Katarina Pohlodkova from Team Josje won the season 3 finale in June.

Season 4 (2018) 
Season 4 of The Voice Kids premiered in September 2018, and for the first time, had four coaches instead of three. Sean Dhondt and Laura Tesoro returned as coaches while Gers Pardoel and K3 replaced the latter's former member Josje Huisman. Jade De Rijcke from Team Gers won the season 4 finale in November.

Season 5 (2020) 
Season 5 of The Voice Kids premiered on 7 February 2020 but was interrupted for several months due to the COVID-19 pandemic in Belgium. All four coaches from the previous season returned, and the live shows commenced in August, with Gala Aliaj winning the season 5 finale on 11 September.

Season 6 (2022) 
Season 6 of The Voice Kids premiered on 25 March 2022. Laura Tesoro and K3 returned as coaches, while Metejoor and Eurovision Song Contest 2019 winner Duncan Laurence replaced Gers Pardoel and Sean Dhondt, respectively. Karista Khan from Team Duncan won the season 6 finale in May.

References

External links 
 

Belgian music television shows
2014 Belgian television series debuts
2010s Belgian television series
VTM (TV channel) original programming
The Voice van Vlaanderen
Television series about children
Television series about teenagers